Lee Hyo-chang (15 September 1922 – 26 August 2006) was a South Korean speed skater. He competed in three events at the 1948 Winter Olympics.

References

1922 births
2006 deaths
South Korean male speed skaters
Olympic speed skaters of South Korea
Speed skaters at the 1948 Winter Olympics
Place of birth missing